Nick Percat (born 14 September 1988) is an Australian racing driver who currently races in the Repco Supercars Championship, driving for Walkinshaw Andretti United in the No. 2 Holden ZB Commodore. He won the Bathurst 1000 at his first attempt, co-driving for Garth Tander for the Holden Racing Team. Percat attended Sacred Heart College in South Australia.

Racing career

Percat won the 2009 Australian Formula Ford Championship in his third season in the category having dominated the season after finishing runner up the previous year to Paul Laskaseski. In 2011 he returned to single seaters for a one off support race for the 2011 Indian Grand Prix driving a Van Diemen built Formula MRF for a winner takes all $50,000 prize. He took pole position and won race one, the first-ever race held at the Buddh International Circuit, but was taken out in race two by eventual winner Jordan King.

On 9 October 2011, he partnered Garth Tander to win the Bathurst 1000 race for the Holden Racing Team. In winning the Bathurst 1000, Percat became the first South Australian born driver to win the race.

On 24 December 2014, it was announced that Percat would contest the 2015 season with Lucas Dumbrell Motorsport. He endured a mediocre season, with a best finish of 6th at the Gold Coast 600. He finished 22nd in the championship despite not racing in the final two rounds of the year due to a foot injury.

The 2016 season kicked off with Percat taking a shock win in unpredictable circumstances at the 2016 Clipsal 500 Adelaide, which was also the first win for the team. Percat became the first South Australian driver to win the local event.

Percat continued his strong form at the 2016 Bathurst 1000 by scoring a podium with co-drive Cameron McConville. Percat has finished on the podium 3 times out of his 8 starts.For the 2017 season, Percat signed a contract to race for Brad Jones Racing, replacing outgoing driver Jason Bright. Results for Percat were mixed due to a horror run of bad luck from the BJR team. The highlight of the year was Percat's first podium for the team at the Darwin Triple Crown event. 

Results for 2018 were much improved for Percat, and the whole BJR team, with Percat scoring 2 podiums at the Australian Grand Prix event, narrowly missing out on winning the Larry Perkins Trophy. Percat finished the year 10th in the championship, his best result to date.

In 2019 Percat took another step forward in the championship. He didn't score a podium, but was one of the most consistent drivers in the field and finished the year in 9th.

In 2020, he enjoyed his best Supercars season to date, finishing 7th in the Championship, claimed two wins during the Sydney SuperSprint round and a podium finish in the second race of the Darwin SuperSprint.

After five seasons with Brad Jones Racing, Percat announced on 26 October 2021 that he would be returning to Walkinshaw Andretti United in 2022 on a multiple-year deal.

Career results

Career summary

Supercars Championship results

Bathurst 1000 results

References

http://www.summitfleet.com.au/news-info/nick-percat-in-the-white-hot-summit-fleet-supercar-at-ipswich-supersprint/

External links
Official website
Driver Database stats
V8 Supercars Official Profile
Profile on Racing Reference

1988 births
Australian Formula 3 Championship drivers
Bathurst 1000 winners
Formula Ford drivers
Living people
Racing drivers from South Australia
Supercars Championship drivers
V8SuperTourer drivers
People educated at Sacred Heart College, Adelaide
Andretti Autosport drivers
United Autosports drivers
Australian Endurance Championship drivers